Łomianki  is a town in Warsaw West County, Masovian Voivodeship, Poland. It had a population of 16,374 in 2008, and 24,328 in 2016. It is part of the Warsaw metropolitan area.

It was the site of the Battle of Łomianki between Polish and German troops, fought on September 22, 1939 during the invasion of Poland.

Attractions
Because the town is located between Kampinos National Park and Vistula river, and just a short distance from the outskirts of Warsaw, it is regarded as a desirable place to live for people who want to combine an outdoor lifestyle while still commuting each day to Warsaw. Kampinos National Park has hundreds of kilometers of cycling trails and the largest inland sand dunes in Europe. Elk and wild boar are often seen there. Łomianki is characterised by big residential houses, particularly around Ulica Zachodnia, and many active community groups. Many expats live in Łomianki, mostly because it is equidistant between the two international airports of the Warsaw metropolitan area, Chopin and Modlin.

Of interest in Łomianki are the Jazz Cafe where live music from all over Poland and beyond is a regular feature, Manufaktura Czekolady which is the only place in Poland where chocolate is made from bean to bar, and the Lemon Tree Pub where most community events are hosted. There are two Italian restaurants, both run by Italians, as well as a gourmet burger bar, a sushi restaurant.

Twin towns and sister cities
 Noyelles-lès-Vermelles, France
 Columbia Heights, Minnesota, USA

Sport
 KS Łomianki, football

Gallery

References

External links

 Official website 

Cities and towns in Masovian Voivodeship
Warsaw West County
Warsaw Governorate
Warsaw Voivodeship (1919–1939)